Dudley Bragg (23 February 1917 – 27 October 1990) was an  Australian rules footballer who played with Hawthorn in the Victorian Football League (VFL).

Notes

External links 

1917 births
1990 deaths
Australian rules footballers from Victoria (Australia)
Hawthorn Football Club players
Coburg Football Club players